This is a list of medical schools located in South Korea.

Western Medicine 

Ajou University, School of Medicine
Catholic Kwandong University, College of Medicine
Catholic University of Daegu, School of Medicine
Catholic University of Korea, College of Medicine
CHA University, Graduate school of Medicine
Cheju National University, College of Medicine
Chonbuk National University, Medical School
Chonnam National University, Medical School
Chosun University, College of Medicine
Chung-Ang University, College of Medicine
Chungbuk National University, College of Medicine
Chungnam National University, College of Medicine
Dankook University, College of Medicine
Dong-A University, College of Medicine
Dongguk University, College of Medicine
Eulji University, College of Medicine
Ewha Womans University, College of Medicine
Gachon University, College of Medicine
Gyeongsang National University, School of Medicine
Hallym University, School of Medicine
Hanyang University, School of Medicine
Inha University, School of Medicine
Inje University, College of Medicine
Kangwon National University, School of Medicine
Keimyung University, School of Medicine
Konkuk University, School of Medicine
Konyang University, College of Medicine
Korea University School of Medicine
Kosin University, College of Medicine
Kyung Hee University, School of Medicine
Kyungpook National University School of Medicine
Pusan National University, School of Medicine
Seoul National University, College of Medicine
Soonchunhyang University, College of Medicine
Sungkyunkwan University, School of Medicine
University of Ulsan College of Medicine
Wonkwang University, College of Medicine
Yeungnam University, College of Medicine
Yonsei University, College of Medicine

Korean Medicine 

Gachon University, College of Korean Medicine
Kyung Hee University, College of Korean Medicine
Daegu Haany University, College of Korean Medicine
DaeJeon University, College of Korean Medicine
Dongguk University, College of Korean Medicine
Dongshin University, College of Korean Medicine
Dong-eui University, College of Korean Medicine
Pusan National University, School of Korean Medicine
Sangji University, College of Korean Medicine
Semyung University, College of Korean Medicine
Woosuk University, College of Korean Medicine
Wonkwang University, College of Korean Medicine

See also

List of medical schools in Asia

South Korea
Medical